Alexander the Great is an album by pianist Monty Alexander (born 1944) recorded in 1964 for the Pacific Jazz label.

Reception

AllMusic rated the album with 4 stars and reviewer Scott Yanow noted: "Even at that early stage (age 20), Alexander had very impressive technique and his Oscar Peterson-influenced style was starting to become distinctive".

Track listing
 "John Brown's Body" (Traditional) - 5:30
 "Jitterbug Waltz" (Fats Waller) - 3:59
 "Comin' Home Baby" (Ben Tucker) - 5:45
 "If I Were a Bell" (Frank Loesser) - 6:18
 "The Grabber" (Monty Alexander) - 5:30
 "Autumn Leaves" (Joseph Kosma, Johnny Mercer) - 5:59
 "I've Never Been in Love Before" (Loesser) - 5:30
 "Blues for Jilly" (Alexander) - 4:40

Personnel 
Monty Alexander - piano
Victor Gaskin - bass 
Paul Humphrey - drums

References 

1965 albums
Pacific Jazz Records albums
Monty Alexander albums